Bart van Est (born 1 November 1956) is a retired Dutch cyclist who was active between 1976 and 1983. He was part of the Dutch team that won the 1978 UCI Road World Championships in the team time trial. He also won the Ronde van Noord-Holland (1977) and individual stages of the Olympia's Tour (1977 and 1978).

References

1956 births
Living people
Dutch male cyclists
People from Steenbergen
UCI Road World Champions (elite men)
UCI Road World Championships cyclists for the Netherlands
Cyclists from North Brabant